Stickney House is a historic home located at Lockport in Niagara County, New York.  It is a two-story stone structure built in 1854 by Marcus Stickney, an early settler of Lockport, in the Italianate style.  It is one of approximately 75 stone residences remaining in the city of Lockport.

In 1836, Marcus Stickney, an abolitionist, bought the property where this house is currently located. He was born in Ithaca and served as postmaster. Stickney moved to nearby Lewiston and started a mercantile store, then moved to Lockport and opened another store. His son Washington inherited the property in 1846 and the house was built several years later.

It was listed on the National Register of Historic Places in 2003.

References

External links
Stickney House - Lockport, NY - U.S. National Register of Historic Places on Waymarking.com

Houses on the National Register of Historic Places in New York (state)
Italianate architecture in New York (state)
Houses completed in 1854
Houses in Niagara County, New York
National Register of Historic Places in Niagara County, New York